NGC 1277 is a lenticular galaxy in the constellation of Perseus.  It is  a member of the Perseus Cluster of galaxies and is located approximately 73 Mpc (megaparsecs) or 220 million light-years from the Milky Way. It has an apparent magnitude of about 14.7. It was discovered on December 4, 1875 by Lawrence Parsons, 4th Earl of Rosse.

NGC 1277 has been called a "relic of the early universe" due to its stars being formed during a 100 million year interval about 12 billion years ago. Stars were formed at a rate of 1000 times that of the Milky Way galaxy's formation rate in a short burst of time. After this process of stellar formation ran its course, NGC 1277 was left populated with metal-rich stars that are about 7 billion years older than the Sun. It is still uncertain whether or not NGC 1277 is a "relic galaxy"; current studies are still researching the possibility. However, observations with Hubble Space Telescope indicate that NGC 1277 lacks metal-poor globular clusters, suggesting that it has accreted little mass over its lifetime and supporting the relic galaxy hypothesis.

Supermassive black hole

This resulted in the initial claim that the black hole in NGC 1277 is one of the largest known in relation to the mass of its host galaxy.

A follow-up study, based on the same data and published the following year, reached a very different conclusion. The black hole was estimated to be between 2 and 5 billion solar masses. This is less than a third of the previously estimated mass, a significant decrease. Models with no black hole at all were also found to provide reasonably good fits to the data, including the central region.

Subsequent investigations employed adaptive optics to acquire a better estimate of the mass of the black hole.
One group made observations using the Gemini Near Infrared Integral Field Spectrometer to better determine the mass of the black hole at the center of NGC 1277. The group used similar models to that of van den Bosch, but with higher spatial resolution.
More recently, a new group made observations using the larger Keck Telescope with superior spatial resolution, and calculated that a black hole with mass  fits best.  Moreover, this value is an order of magnitude smaller than first reported by van den Bosch, and was noted to probably be an upper limit due to the edge-on rotating disk in NGC 1277.

See also
 List of galaxies
 List of nearest galaxies
 List of spiral galaxies

References

External links
 

Perseus (constellation)
Lenticular galaxies
Peculiar galaxies
Perseus Cluster
1277
012434
Supermassive black holes